Abbey is an electoral ward of the Borough of Reading, in the English county of Berkshire. The ruins of Reading Abbey lie within the boundaries of the ward, a fact from which it derives its name. The ward covers the centre of the town, south of the River Thames, and is bordered by Battle, Thames, Redlands, Katesgrove and Coley wards. Although including significant portions of both the suburbs of West Reading and East Reading, the ward lies almost entirely within the Reading East parliamentary constituency, with only a few streets to the west of George Street in the Reading West parliamentary constituency.

As of 2016, there were some 13,500 people living in Abbey ward, of whom 16.1% were aged under 16, 6% were aged 65 and over, and 44% were born outside the UK. The population lives in a total of just under 6,800 dwellings, of which 57% are in purpose-built blocks of flats, just over 20% each are terraced houses, and just over 10% are flat conversions or shared houses, with detached and semi-detached houses making up the rest. Of the population aged between 16 and 74, 72.4% are in employment and 5.1% are unemployed. Of those in employment, 60% are in managerial, professional or technical occupations, with 34% in professional occupations.

As with all Reading wards, the ward elects three councillors to Reading Borough Council.  Elections since 2004 are held by thirds, with elections in three years out of four. These councillors are currently: Tony Page (2016; Labour), Karen Rowland (2018; Labour) and Mohammed Ayub (2019; Labour).

References

Wards of Reading